State Road 527 (SR 527) is a major arterial road through the Orlando MSA extending  through Orange County. Its southern terminus is at SR 482.

Route description
Starting at its northern terminus with an intersection of Fairbanks Avenue in Winter Park area it is known as Orange Avenue. As a state road, the route travels through a heavily urbanized area of Orlando (passing right smack down the Downtown Orlando) and its suburbs. In Downtown it splits with its northbound segment from Lake Lucerne to Lake Ivanhoe travels along Rosalind Avenue and Magnolia Avenue, while its southbound travels through the Downtown along Orange Avenue.

County Road 527
At Sand Lake Road where SR 527 terminates, Orange Avenue continues on as County Road 527 (Orange County). As such it travels all the way to Osceola Parkway which is located in Osceola County. The route crosses a county line just before the intersection after it crosses the overpass over FL-91 (Florida Turnpike) and continues south now as CR 527  (Osceola County). The route breaks off at Osceola Parkway and resumes about a block westward down Osceola Parkway as Old Dixie Highway in Osceola County. The southern terminus of CR 527 is with an intersection of Donegan Avenue in Kissimmee. There is a connecting street which extends the route to Orange Blossom Trail in Kissimmee.

Passing locations and points of interest
Along the entire route, the places passed are Meadow Woods, Southchase, Taft, Belle Isle, Pine Castle, Edgewood, Orlando, and Winter Park. In Downtown Orlando, it is one of the 2 state roads that border Lake Eola, the other being SR 526.

History
SR 3A was defined by number in 1935 state law, chapter 17341, approved May 27, 1935:
 A certain road described as extending from the intersection of Orange Avenue and Fairbanks Avenue in Winter Park, then Southerly on Orange Avenue to its intersection with State Road 22 in the City of Orlando.

This was established to keep this section of former SR 3, which was to be bypassed around 1937 along the Orlando Shortcut (now Orlando Avenue) and Mills Avenue, a state road (and probably part of US 17/US 92). South of SR 22 (Colonial Drive), Orange Avenue was still part of SR 2.

SR 3A was extended in both directions by number in 1939 state law chapter 19049, approved May 12, 1939:
 Beginning at the point where the new location of State Road No. 3 intersects with the old location near the south line of the Town of Lake Maitland, thence along said old location thereof and along Park, Fairbanks and Orange Avenue in Winter Park, Orange Avenue in Orlando, and such route as may be selected by the State Road Department from Orange Avenue to Kuhl Avenue in Orlando, to the South city limits thereof, thence along the present Orlando and Kissimmee road to the county-line between Orange and Osceola Counties.

This kept the rest of old SR 3 in Winter Park in the State Road system, as well as old SR 2 south of SR 22 (Colonial Drive), which was bypassed around 1939.

Some state maps show SR 3A on old SR 2 north of Kissimmee in Osceola County and through Maitland into Seminole County, but it doesn't appear that these were added, unless they were added in 1941 when most of the through roads in Orange County were designated as State Roads.

In the 1945 renumbering, most of SR 3A became SR 527; SR 527 extended south into Osceola County but not north to Seminole County. The part between Orlando Avenue and the Park Avenue/Fairbanks Avenue intersection in Winter Park instead became part of SR 426, and was a gap in SR 527.

Major intersections

See also
 List of county roads in Orange County, Florida
 List of county roads in Osceola County, Florida

References

External links

Florida Route Log (SR 527)

527
527
527
527